Kamuli is a town in the Eastern Region of Uganda. It is the main municipal, administrative, and commercial centre of Kamuli District, and the district headquarters are located there. The district is named after the town.

Location

The coordinates of Kamuli Town are 0°56'42.0"N, 33°07'30.0"E (Latitude:0.9450; Longitude:33.1250).

Population
According to the 2014 national census and population survey, the population of Kamuli Municipality was 58,984. In July 2020, the Uganda Bureau of Statistics, estimated the mid-year population of the town at 67,800.

Administration
The town is administered by a Municipal Council headed by a mayor. There is an elected Municipal Council of fifteen councillors. The annual budget for the municipality in the 2019/2020 financial year that ended on 30 June 2020 was UGX:6,921,343,000 (US$1,908,570).

Points of interest
The following points of interest lie within the town limits or close to its borders:

1. The headquarters of Kamuli District Administration

2. The offices of Kamuli Town Council

3. Kamuli Central Market

4. Kamuli Mission Hospital, a 160-bed private hospital, owned by the Roman Catholic Diocese of Jinja

5. Kamuli General Hospital, a 100-bed public hospital, owned by the Ugandan Government, which serves as the district hospital for Kamuli District and surrounding communities.

6.

Notable people
 Rebecca Kadaga, politician

References

External links

 Is Kamuli Drifting from Its Plan? Published 19 October 2013. Retrieved 12 May 2014

Populated places in Eastern Region, Uganda
Cities in the Great Rift Valley
Kamuli District
Busoga
fi:Kamuli